The Science, Technology, Engineering and Mathematics Education Program (STEM, formerly Engineering and Science Education Program or ESEP) is a science and mathematics-oriented curriculum devised for high schools in the Philippines. The STEM program is offered by specialized high schools, whether public or private, supervised by the Department of Education. Currently, there are 110 high schools offering the STEM program, the majority being public. It was piloted in 1994 by the Department of Science & Technology (DOST).

Comparison between the STEM, the RSHS Union and the PSHS System
All three types of science high schools in the Philippines (STEM high schools, high schools in the Regional Science High School Union and the Philippine Science High School System) offer a curriculum placing importance in mathematics and the sciences, as well as research. It is noted though that the RSHS Union and the PSHS System have much higher standards of science and mathematics education than STEM high schools. Likewise, STEM high schools and the RSHS Union are operated by Department of Education, while the PSHS system is operated by Department of Science and Technology.

In STEM high schools, transfer students are permitted to enroll provided the student is coming from another STEM high school, from an RSHS or from the PSHS System. In the Regional Science High School Union and the PSHS System, transfers are only allowed within their respective systems for incoming sophomores only. Students who wish to transfer from an STEM high school to the RSHS or PSHS systems will not be admitted, although the reverse is permissible.

All three types of science high school also maintain different grading systems. STEM high schools and the RSHS Union apply the standard grading system for high schools in the Philippines, while the PSHS System maintains a unique grading system using the 1.00-5.00 scale.

Academic Programme

Philippine Science High School (PSHS) Core Curriculum

Electives

Regional Science High School (RSHS) Curriculum

Science, Technology, Engineering and Mathematics Program (STEM) Curriculum

Other programs in other fields

Technical-Vocational Education Program (TVEP)
The Tech-Voc program seeks to provide early training for labor skills, particularly on machine works, trade, agriculture, information technology, among others. The program is offered to graduating high school students and its main purpose is to either prepare them for college or to enable them to work in various industries.

The technical-vocational program has 18 areas of specialization which includes: machine shop, automotive technology, welding, electronics technology, building construction, furniture and cabinet making, plumbing, electricity, computer technology, food processing, animal production, fish processing, fish capture, fish culture, agriculture, PC operations and technical drawing.

Currently, there are 280 Tech-Voc high schools in the Philippines, 140 of which are priority Tech-Voc high schools.

Special Program in the Arts (SPA)
Special Program in the Arts is designed to cater to the needs of students who are talented in the arts. It is a program for students with potential talents in different fields of arts, namely, Music, Visual Arts, Theater Arts, Media Arts, Creative Writing and Dance. The Program offers a comprehensive secondary education centered in the arts, covering a range of art forms and disciplines. Arts education is an integral component of a balanced educational program and also provides the background for post-secondary level work.

Special Program in Journalism (SPJ)
Special Program in Journalism is developed to enrich the experiences, hone the journalistic skills and competencies of student-writers and to strengthen free and responsible journalism. It is designed to develop the learners’ skills in mass communication, print, online and broadcast media. Its main focus is primarily on writing as a process and as an art.

Special Program for Sports (SPS)
The Special Program in Sports is in the line with efforts of the DepEd to institutionalize a program that will identify/discover students with potential sports talents and train them for higher levels of athletic competitions. The Special Program for Sports offers a four-year secondary curriculum patterned after that of a regular high school, with specialization in sports.

Special Science Grade School (SSGS)
As part of the expansion program of the Department of Educations' Engineering and Science Education Program, the Special Science Elementary School was established, to serve as feeder school for science high schools. This program envisions developing Filipino children who are equipped with scientific and technological knowledge, skills and attitudes; creative and have positive values; and lifelong learning skills to become productive partners in the development of the community and society and it aims to determine the qualities that science inclined learners possess; describe the characteristics of a good special elementary school; and determine the factors inputted into the SSES that significantly contribute to the improved performance of the learners involved in the study. Currently there are 57 special science elementary schools entire the Philippines.

SSES, according to the guidelines should have "state of the art" technology that provides for standard size classrooms of 7 meters by 9 meters with at least two computers, a television set, cassette recorder, player LCD projector, OHP, VHS/VCD/DVD player for every classroom. The classrooms should also have science laboratories, computer laboratory with multimedia and internet facilities; speech laboratory; music room and musical instruments and a gym with functional sports facilities.

References

Education in the Philippines
Philippines educational programs